The Wuqiao mutiny (吳橋兵變) was a soldier rebellion from 1631 to 1633 during the late years of Ming Dynasty, led by Kong Youde and Geng Zhongming, both of whom were lieutenants under the command of general Mao Wenlong, the defender of Pi Island.

Background 
After Mao was summarily executed in 1629 by Yuan Chonghuan, Geng Zhongming started raiding Joseon for supplies, but was found out and jailed by his newly appointed superior Huang Long.  Zhongming's brother Zhongyu revolted against Huang Long and imprisoned him.  Although Huang was eventually released, he was impeached by Sun Yuanhua for embezzling army funds.  Conflicts between officers led to Kong Youde and Geng Zhongming (both of whom still held strong grudge over the execution of Mao) being transferred to Dengzhou in Shandong under the command of Sun Yuanhua (a protégé of Xu Guangqi), where they were put in charge of training troops using firearms.

Mutiny 
In late 1631, Kong was called in to reinforce Ming forces at the Battle of Dalinghe, but his soldiers (mostly conscripts from Liaodong region) were undersupplied and underpaid, and had difficulties obtaining provisions due to conflict with the Shandong locals.  While passing the town of Wuqiao, the regiment was bogged down by bad weather, and the local magistrate deliberately allowed the merchants to close the markets and refuse to sell the troops provisions. One of the starving soldiers stole a chicken from the household of the powerful gentry Wang Xiangchun, and Wang's servant had the soldier paraded and humiliated through the camp with an arrow impaled through the face.  This enraged the fellow soldiers, who rioted and killed Wang's servant. This escalation prompted Wang's son to personally intervene and demanded that all the perpetrators be harshly punished. At the same time, Kong's subordinate Li Jiucheng had spent off all the funds provided by Sun Yuanhua and feared getting into trouble, and coerced Kong to mutiny.

The mutineers sacked the Wang household, raided Jinan and fanned out to take Linyi, Ling County, Shanghe and Qingcheng, and captured Dengzhou on February 22, 1632 when Geng Zhongming defected to the mutineers and handed over the city.  Sun Yuanhua was captured but managed to convince Kong to surrender peacefully, however the amnesty decree was suppressed by censorial inspector Wang Daochun, who held a hardline approach to the rebels.  Growing impatient, Kong resumed his rebellion, but released Sun out of their friendship.  However, the failure to defend Dengzhou led to the impeachment of Sun Yuanhua by his political enemies. He was accused of treason, which led to torture in prison and eventually his execution in 1633.

After more victories, Kong's rebel arrived at Laizhou in March and began a 6-month siege. The Ming central government mobilized Gao Qiqian, Wu Xiang, and Wu Sangui with 12,000 men to relieve Laizhou.  Rebel forces were eventually smashed and forced to retreat to Dengzhou, where they were reduced to cannibalism before Kong and Geng escaped by sea with their remaining followers, defecting to the Later Jin in the spring of 1633, bringing large numbers of Hongyipao and skilled laborers and artillerymen to the Jurchens. Both Kong and Geng were appointed lords by Hong Taiji, who rejoiced at the defection of these high-profile Ming commanders.

References

Bibliography
 .

Rebellions in the Ming dynasty
17th century in China
Mutinies